A  is the third-level administrative division of Italy, roughly equivalent to a township or municipality. It is the third-level administrative division of Italy, after regions (regioni) and provinces (province).

It can be divided into frazioni, which in turn may have limited power due to special elective assemblies.

In the autonomous region of the Aosta Valley, a comune is officially called a commune in French.

Overview
The  provides essential public services: registry of births and deaths, registry of deeds, and maintenance of local roads and public works. Many  have a Polizia Comunale (communal police), which is responsible for public order duties.

The  is chaired by the mayor, who appoints others members, called , one of whom serves as deputy mayor.

As of January 2021, there were 7,904  in Italy; they vary considerably in size and population.

Atrani in the province of Salerno (Campania) was the smallest  by area, with only , and Morterone (Lombardy) is the smallest by population. Many present-day  trace their roots along timescales spanning centuries and at times millennia.

The northernmost  is Predoi, the southernmost one Lampedusa e Linosa, the westernmost Bardonecchia and the easternmost Otranto.

The population density of the  varies widely by province and region. The province of Barletta-Andria-Trani, for example, has 381,091 inhabitants in 10 , or over 39,000 inhabitants per ; whereas the province of Isernia has 81,415 inhabitants in 52 , or 1,640 inhabitants per  – roughly 24 times more communal units per inhabitant.

Subdivisions

Administrative subdivisions within  vary according to their population size.

These bodies are headed by an elected president and a local council.

Smaller  usually comprise:
 Outlying areas often called  (singular: , abbreviated: , literally 'fraction'), each usually centred on a small town or village. These  usually never had pasts as independent settlements, but occasionally are former smaller  consolidated into a larger one. Even smaller places are called  ('localities',).

Homonymy

There are not many perfect homonymous . There are only six cases in 12 :
 Calliano: Calliano, Piedmont and Calliano, Trentino
 Castro: Castro, Apulia and Castro, Lombardy
 Livo: Livo, Lombardy and Livo, Trentino
 Peglio: Peglio, Lombardy and Peglio, Marche
 Samone: Samone, Piedmont and Samone, Trentino
 San Teodoro: San Teodoro, Sardinia and San Teodoro, Sicily

Remarkably two provincial capitals share the name : Reggio nell'Emilia, the capital of the province of Reggio Emilia, in the Emilia-Romagna region, and Reggio di Calabria, the capital of the homonymous metropolitan city, in the Calabria region. Many other towns or villages are likewise partial homonyms (e.g. Anzola dell'Emilia and Anzola d'Ossola, or Bagnara Calabra and Bagnara di Romagna).

Title of city

The  endowed with the title of  usually carry the golden crown above their coat of arms, except with different provisions in the decree approving the coat of arms or in the presence). "The crown of the city ([...]) is formed by a golden circle opened by eight city gates (five visible) with two cordoned walls on the margins, supporting eight towers (five visible) joined by curtain walls, all in gold and black walled".

Statistics

Largest comuni by area
The following is a list of the largest  in Italy, in descending order of surface area, according to ISTAT data referring to 9 October 2011. The provincial capitals are highlighted in bold.

Smallest comuni by area
The following is a list of the smallest  in Italy, in ascending order of surface area, according to ISTAT data referring to 9 October 2011.

Highest comuni by altitude
The following is a list of the first  by altitude, in descending order. The indicated altitude coincides with the height above sea level of the town hall.

Largest comuni by population
List of the first  by population in descending order, according to ISTAT data updated to 28 February 2022. The regional capitals are in bold.

Comuni by demographic ranges
The data is updated as of 1 January 2021.

Demographic ranges by macroregion
The data is updated as of 1 January 2021.

See also

 Regions of Italy
 Metropolitan cities of Italy
 Provinces of Italy
 List of municipalities of Italy
 List of renamed municipalities in Italy
 Alphabetical list of municipalities of Italy
 Fusion of municipalities of Italy
 Municipalities of Switzerland – those in Italian-speaking areas of the country are called

References

External links
 Associazione Nazionale Comuni Italiani 
 
 

 
Types of administrative division
Subdivisions of Italy
Italy